Tegeticula mojavella is a moth of the family Prodoxidae. It is found in the United States in the Mojave Desert, from southern Nevada and California south to the Mexican border. The habitat consists of bajadas and lower slopes of open desert.

Its wingspan is 19–24.5 mm. The forewings are cream colored and the hindwings are light brownish gray with a darker outer section.

The larvae feed on Yucca schidigera. They feed on developing seeds. Pupation takes place in a cocoon in the soil.

References

Moths described in 1999
Prodoxidae